William Henry Johnson is the name of:

William Henry Johnson (valet) (died 1864), part-time valet and barber to Abraham Lincoln
William Henry Johnson (VC) (1890–1945), English First World War recipient of the Victoria Cross
Henry Johnson (World War I soldier) (born William Henry Johnson, 1892–1929), American First World War recipient of the Medal of Honor
William Johnson (artist) (born William Henry Johnson, 1901–1970), African-American painter
 Peerie Willie Johnson (1920–2007), Scottish folk guitarist and bassist
 Zip the Pinhead (1842–1926), American freak show performer

See also

William Henry Johnston (1879–1915), Scottish First World War recipient of the Victoria Cross
William Johnson (disambiguation)
 Henry Johnson (disambiguation)
 Johnson (disambiguation)